Area code 479 is a telephone area code in the North American Numbering Plan (NANP) for thirteen counties in the northwestern part of the U.S. state of Arkansas. The numbering plan area (NPA) includes the cities of Bentonville, Fort Smith, Fayetteville, Rogers, Siloam Springs and Springdale. It was created on January 19, 2002 in a split from area code 501.

Service area
Area code 479 serves the counties of Benton, Crawford, Franklin, Johnson, Logan, Madison, Polk, Pope, Scott, Sebastian, Washington and Yell, and parts of  Carroll County, the rest being served with area code 870.

See also

 List of exchanges from AreaCodeDownload.com, 479 Area Code

479
479